North Carolina Highway 905 (NC 905) is a primary state highway in the U.S. state of North Carolina. It serves as part of an alternate route between Whiteville and Conway, South Carolina, through southeastern Columbus County.

Route description
NC 905 is a two-lane rural highway that begins at the South Carolina line and South Carolina Highway 905 (SC 905) in Olyphic. Traveling north, it connects with NC 904 in Pireway.

The route is part of a larger alternate route to U.S. Route 701 between Whiteville, North Carolina and Conway, South Carolina via NC 130 and SC 905.  From 1958 to 2016, it was the highest number signed as a primary route in North Carolina.

History
NC 905 was established around 1958 as an extension of SC 905, which had ended at the state line since around 1942. Its route from Olyphic to Pleasant Plains has remained unchanged since.

Junction list

References

External links

 NCRoads.com: N.C. 905

905
Transportation in Columbus County, North Carolina